The Morocco national futsal team, nicknamed Ousoud Al Atlas (Lions of the Atlas) represents Morocco in international futsal competitions. It is affiliated to the Royal Moroccan Football Federation and is one of the strongest teams in The world. The team has notably won  the Africa Futsal Cup of Nations title in the last two editions (2016 and 2020) and qualified for the World Cup three times, first appearing in 2012.

History
Morocco was the runner-up for the 1998 Arab Futsal Championship and the 2000 African Futsal Championship and ended in the 3rd place in the 2008 African Futsal Championship.

At the 2010 UNAF tournament, the Moroccan national team obtained the 2nd place after winning against the Algeria 7-2, the Palestinian selection 7-1, and Tunisia 4-4. In the final it will lose against Libya 4-3.

The Moroccan team will compete in the Mediterranean Futsal Cup where it will obtained 5th place. National Futsal coach Hicham Dguig will be elected as the best coach of the competition organized in Libya. The player Yahya Baya will appear in the typical team of the tournament won by Croatia.

On 24 April 2016, Morocco won its first ever african title after defeating Egypt 3-2 in the final. 4 years later, they won their second title after defeating Egypt 5-0 in the final.

On 29 May 2021, They won their first Arab cup in 2021 after defeating Egypt 4-0 in the final. In the 2021 FIFA Futsal World Cup, Morocco qualified to the knockout stages after finishing second in the group stages winning one match and drawing two. They were knocked out in the Quarter-Finals after losing 1-0 to Brazil. They went on to win the next Arab cup edition, claiming their second Arab cup title after defeating Iraq 3-0. On 5 September 2022, they were ranked 8th in the Futsal world ranking ahead of Italy and behind Kazakhstan.

On 16 September 2022, Morocco defeated Iran 4-3 in the final, to win its first ever Confederations Cup.

Competitive record

FIFA Futsal World Cup

Futsal Confederations Cup

Africa Futsal Cup of Nations

Arab Futsal Championship

North African Futsal Tournament

World ranking 
Rankings are calculated by Futsal World Ranking.

Team

Current squad
The final Squad for the 2021 FIFA Futsal World Cup was announced on 2 September 2021.
Head coach  Hicham Dguig

Previous squads

FIFA Futsal World Cup squads
2012 FIFA Futsal World Cup squad
2016 FIFA Futsal World Cup squad

Africa Futsal Cup of Nations
2020 Africa Futsal Cup of Nations squad

Honours

Official competitions 
Africa Futsal Cup of Nations
  Champions: 2016, 2020
  Runner-up: 2000
  Third-place: 2008, 2004
Futsal Confederations Cup
  Champions: 2022
Arab Futsal Cup
  Champions: 2021, 2022
  Runners-up: 1998, 2005

Friendly Tournament

North African Futsal Tournament
  Runners-up: 2005, 2010

UEFS Futsal Men's Championship
  Runners-up: 1998

CFA International Futsal Tournament
  Champions: 2019
Futsal Week Winter Cup
  Champions: 2020

See also
Sport in Morocco
Morocco national football team

References

External links
Morocco FA official site

African national futsal teams
Futsal
National